El Mela is a mountain in the Andes. It is located in the La Rioja Province of Argentina.

See also
 List of Ultras of South America
 List of peaks by prominence

References

Mountains of Argentina